"Tu primo grande amore" ("You, first great love") is a song by Italian singer Vincenzo Cantiello.  It  and was the winning song at the Junior Eurovision Song Contest 2014 in Marsa, Malta.

The song is about love at first sight and was written by Cantiello himself.

Music video
The music video was released on 7 October 2014. It shows Cantiello singing on the stage of an empty theatre.  A cell phone, attached to the ceiling, records his performance. At the end of the video, the cell phone lies on a bed. Its screen reads "Hi! Vincenzo has sent you a video clip :-)" and the song's title appears in a blue speech bubble underneath.

References

External links
 Official music video released by the Junior Eurovision Song Contest channel on YouTube.

Italian songs
Junior Eurovision Song Contest winning songs
2014 singles
2014 songs